Lucha is the Spanish for "fight, struggle". It may refer to
wrestling
 Lucha libre (show wrestling)
 Lucha, a publication by the Communist Party of Labour in the Dominican Republic
 Lucha Underground American Mexican wrestling promotion and television series which airs on El Rey Network
Lutte Pour Le Changement, a civil rights organisation in the Democratic Republic Congo (DRC)